Holy Ghost Building is a 2008 album by the Sacramento-based rock band The 77s.

Track listing 

 "I'm Working on a Building"
 "Keep Your Lamps Trimmed and Burning"
 "Stranger, Won't You Change Your Sinful Ways"
 "I'll Remember You, Love, in My Prayers"
 "You're Gonna Be Sorry"
 "What Would You Give in Exchange for Your Soul"
 "He's a Mighty Good Leader"
 "When My Blue Moon Turns to Gold Again"
 "Everybody Ought to Pray Sometime"
 "City of Refuge"
 "A Lifetime Without You"

Personnel 

 Mike Roe – vocals, guitar
 David Leonhardt – guitar
 Mark Harmon – bass
 Bruce Spencer – drums

References 

The 77s albums
2008 albums